was originally the area around today's Sakurai City in Nara Prefecture of Japan, which became Yamato Province and by extension a name for the whole of Japan.

Yamato is also the dynastic name of the ruling Imperial House of Japan.

Japanese history
 Yamato people, the dominant ethnic group of Japan
 Yamato period, when the Japanese Imperial court ruled from Yamato Province
 Yamato clan, clan active in Japan since the Kofun period
 Yamato-damashii, the "Japanese spirit", or Yamato-gokoro, the "Japanese heart/mind"
 Yamato nadeshiko, the ideology of the perfect Japanese woman
 Yamato Takeru, a legendary Japanese prince of the Yamato dynasty
 Yamato-e, classical Japanese painting
 Yamato-uta, alternative term for waka (poetry)
 Yamatai, ancient geographical term that may be associated with Yamato
 Daiwa (disambiguation) is spelled using the same kanji as Yamato

Geography

Japan
 Yamato Province, Japan, former province, present-day Nara Prefecture
 Yamato, Fukuoka, a town in Fukuoka Prefecture
 Yamato, Fukushima, a town in Fukushima Prefecture
 Yamato, Gifu, former town now part of Gujo City, Japan
 Yamato, Ibaraki, a village in Ibaraki Prefecture
 Yamato, Kagoshima, a village in Kagoshima Prefecture
 Yamato, Kanagawa, a city in Kanagawa Prefecture
 Yamato, Kumamoto, a town in Kumamoto Prefecture
 Yamato, Niigata, former town now part of the city of Minamiuonuma
 Yamato, Saga, a town in Saga Prefecture
 Yamato, Yamaguchi, former town now part of Hikari
 Yamato, Yamanashi, a village in Yamanashi Prefecture
 Yamato River, a river in Nara and Osaka Prefecture
 Yamato Town, later renamed Wakō, Saitama
 Yamato Village, later renamed Higashiyamato, Tokyo

United States
 Yamato Colony, California, Japanese-American agricultural community
 Yamato Colony, Florida, former Japanese farm settlement

Antarctica
 Yamato Glacier
 Yamato Mountains

Meteorites
 Yamato 691, 4.5-billion-year-old meteorite
 Yamato 791197, lunar meteorite found on Earth
 Yamato 000593, Martian meteorite found on Earth

Ships
 Yamato (ship), several Japanese ships of this name
 Yamato-class battleship
 Japanese battleship Yamato
 Japanese corvette Yamato
 Yamato 1

Companies
 Yamato Life Insurance Company, Japan
 Yamato Transport, Japan, delivery service

Animals
 Caridina multidentata (Yamato shrimp)

Language
 Yamato kotoba, native Japanese language vocabulary

People
 Yamato (surname)
 Yamato (given name)
 Yamato (wrestler), Japanese professional wrestler

Entertainment
 Wadaiko Yamato, Japanese musical group
 Yamato (film), about the World War II battleship Yamato
 Space Battleship Yamato (2010 film), Japanese live action film
 Yamato Man, a robot master in Mega Man 6 and Mega Man Battle Network 3
 Yamato, the signature sword wielded by Vergil in the Devil May Cry franchise
 The Ark of Yamato, an area in the video game Ōkami
 The Yamato Perpetual Reactor, a particle accelerator from Shin Megami Tensei IV
 Yamato, a battlecruiser cannon from the StarCraft franchise
 Takeshi Yamato, alter ego of Ultraman 80's TV show

Anime and manga
 Space Battleship Yamato (disambiguation), Japanese TV, film and game series; Star Blazers in the West
 Yamato Takeru (anime)
 Yamato Takeru (film)
 Shiroi Senshi Yamato (Yamato, the White Fighter), a manga by Yoshihiro Takahashi
 Takeru Yamato, character in the Eyeshield 21 manga
 Yamato, Kaido's daughter from One Piece characters

Publications
 Yamato (magazine), Italian propaganda magazine published during World War II

See also
 An Investigation of Global Policy with the Yamato Race as Nucleus
 Yamoto (disambiguation)
Yamato is usually written as "大和", but these two characters can also be read as "Daiwa" or "Taiwa".

Yamato may erroneously refer to the identically-written:
 Daiwa, Hiroshima, now part of the city of Mihara, Japan
 Daiwa, Shimane, now part of the town of Misato, Japan
 Taiwa, Miyagi, a town in Miyagi Prefecture
 Daiwa Bank, now a part of Resona Holdings

Japanese-language surnames
Japanese masculine given names